Kundiman ng Puso is a 1958 Philippine musical-romantic film produced by Sampaguita Pictures. The film is in black and white.

Plot
Rodriguez and Dauden play sisters and Arenas and Marzan best friends who go abroad to Italy for work. Arenas becomes angry when Rodriguez sends a letter that she is pregnant.

Cast
 Lolita Rodriguez
 Eddie Arenas
 Marlene Dauden
 Tony Marzan
 Nori Dalisay
 Rod Navarro

References

External links

1958 films
Tagalog-language films
1958 romantic drama films
Philippine romantic drama films
Sampaguita Pictures films
Philippine black-and-white films